Rodney Scott Kinnear (11 May 1931 – 2 May 2006) was an Australian director, best known for his work in TV.

Select credits
Lovely to Look At (1957) (TV series)
Tragedy in a Temporary Town (1959)
The Big Day (1959)
No Picnic Tomorrow (1960)
Man in a Blue Vase (1960)
The Sammy Davis Jnr Show (1960) - film of Sammy Davis Jnr in Australia - Kinnear was floor manager
The Concert (1961)
In the Southern Cross Hotel Tonight (1962) - TV variety special - producer
The One Day of the Year (1962)
In Melbourne Tonight
Rolf Harris Special (1966)
Berioska Ballet (1966)
Benny Hill Down Under (1977)
Barley Charlie (1964) (TV series)
The World of the Seekers (1968)
Ash Wednesday (1983) (documentary)

References

External links
Rod Kinnear at National Film and Sound Archive
Rod Kinnear at IMDb
Rod Kinnear at Austlit

1931 births
2006 deaths
Australian television directors
Logie Award winners